Garry Valk (born November 27, 1967) is a Canadian broadcaster and former professional ice hockey player. After finishing his playing career, Valk became a television analyst.

Playing career
He was selected 108th overall in the 1987 NHL Entry Draft. Valk had a ten-year NHL career, debuting with the Vancouver Canucks in the 1990–91 season, scoring ten goals and eleven assists for twenty-one points, while recording sixty-seven penalty minutes. Valk's strongest career year came in 1993–94, when he recorded forty-five points in seventy-eight games for the Mighty Ducks of Anaheim, after being selected in the NHL's expansion draft.

Arguably his best work came in the late 1990s, when he was signed as a free agent by the Toronto Maple Leafs. Valk became a player-coach that Pat Quinn depended on, fighting off opponents in crucial situations while also being an offensive threat.

Career highlights for Valk include the 1998–1999 playoffs, when he scored a key overtime goal to lift the Toronto Maple Leafs over the Pittsburgh Penguins in the second round of the NHL playoffs.

Valk finished his career with a brief stint in 2003 with the Chicago Blackhawks.

Post-playing career
Valk retired to pursue an interest in broadcasting, and to spend time with his family. Today, Garry coaches his son's junior hockey team in North Vancouver, British Columbia, and was featured in a Canadian Business Magazine article on athletes who have gone on to be successful after their careers. He is also a Vancouver Canucks analyst on the sports news show Sportsnet Connected

In 2010, developers of a downtown Toronto condominium project enlisted the public's assistance in picking a name for the structure.  Among the names submitted in the Internet poll, "Garry Valk Plaza" proved to be amongst the most popular entries.

Career statistics

Regular season and playoffs

References

External links

1967 births
Living people
Canadian ice hockey left wingers
Chicago Blackhawks players
Mighty Ducks of Anaheim players
Milwaukee Admirals (IHL) players
Norfolk Admirals players
North Dakota Fighting Hawks men's ice hockey players
Pittsburgh Penguins players
Toronto Maple Leafs players
Ice hockey people from Edmonton
Vancouver Canucks draft picks
Vancouver Canucks players